Relief map or mapping may refer to:
Raised-relief map, a 3D physical representation of terrain
Relief mapping (computer graphics), the 3D digital rendering of texture, which may simulate shadows
Topographic map, a 2D depiction of terrestrial relief, using terrain cartography

See also
Relief (disambiguation)